Jennifer Chu is a Korean American beauty pageant queen.  She was crowned Miss Asia USA in 2005, and crowned her successor, Jennifer Pham, the following year. At the time she was crowned, she resided in both Calabasas, California and Santa Barbara, California. She attended the University of California, Santa Barbara, and was declared as a Psychology major.

References

External links
https://web.archive.org/web/20070823215127/http://www.indonesiamedia.com/2006/05/early/local/miss%20asia.htm

American people of Korean descent
Living people
Miss Asia USA delegates
People from Calabasas, California
Year of birth missing (living people)